Paul Kayser (22 September 1869, in Hamburg – 23 September 1942, in Donaueschingen) was a German painter and graphic artist.

Biography 
From 1890 to 1894, he worked as a decorative painter in Hamburg.

In 1902, he married  Melanie Hertz, daughter of the physicist Heinrich Hertz, and they had two children. At that time, he was a private art teacher.

Due to the destruction resulting from World War II, he left Hamburg in 1941 to settle in Donaueschingen, on the Swiss border, where he died one year later.

His style was heavily influenced by Albert Marquet, whom he had met in 1909, and reunited with during a trip to Paris in 1933. His notable works include two large paintings that were created as decorations for the ocean liner SS Imperator.

His works were part of a major exhibition in 2019: Hamburger Schule – Das 19. Jahrhundert neu entdeckt at the Hamburger Kunsthalle.

Selected paintings

Sources 
 
 Hamburger Kunsthalle, Hamburger Ansichten. Maler sehen die Stadt. Wienand Verlag, Köln 2009, pg.190.
 Anna Lena Meyer: Paul Kayser, Maler. In: Olaf Matthes and Ortwin Pelc: Menschen in der Revolution. Hamburger Porträts 1918/19. Husum Verlag, Husum 2018, pgs.92–94.
 Kayser, Paul. In: Ernst Rump (Ed.): Lexikon der bildenden Künstler Hamburgs, Altonas und der näheren Umgebung. Bröcker, Hamburg 1912
 Kayser, Paul. In: Hans Vollmer (Ed.): Allgemeines Lexikon der Bildenden Künstler von der Antike bis zur Gegenwart, Vol. 20: Kaufmann–Knilling. E. A. Seemann, Leipzig 1927, pg.46

External links 

 More works by Kayser @ ArtNet
 Works by Kayser @ the Galerie-Herold

1869 births
1942 deaths
19th-century German painters
19th-century German male artists
Artists from Hamburg
20th-century German painters
20th-century German male artists